Mohammadabad Pol-e Abrisham (also Romanized as Moḩammadābād Pol-e Abrīsham; also known as Moḩammadābād) is a village in Kalat-e Hay-ye Sharqi Rural District, in the Central District of Meyami County, Semnan Province, Iran. At the 2006 census, its population was 181, in 43 families.

References 

Populated places in Meyami County